Per Håkan Ramhorn, (born 3 November 1967 in Fosie) is a Swedish politician for the Sweden Democrats, and a member of the Riksdagen since 2010.

References 

1967 births
Living people
Members of the Riksdag 2010–2014
Members of the Riksdag from the Social Democrats
Politicians from Malmö